In mathematical logic, the diagonal lemma  (also known as diagonalization lemma, self-reference lemma or fixed point theorem) establishes the existence of self-referential sentences in certain formal theories of the natural numbers—specifically those theories that are strong enough to represent all computable functions. The sentences whose existence is secured by the diagonal lemma can then, in turn, be used to prove fundamental limitative results such as  Gödel's incompleteness theorems and Tarski's undefinability theorem.

Background 
Let  be the set of natural numbers. A first-order theory  in the language of arithmetic represents the computable function  if there exists a "graph" predicate  in the language of  such that for each 
 

The diagonal lemma also requires a systematic way of assigning to every formula  a natural number  (also written as ) called its Gödel number. Formulas can then be represented within  by the numerals corresponding to their Gödel numbers. For example,  is represented by 

The diagonal lemma applies to theories capable of representing all primitive recursive functions. Such theories include first-order Peano arithmetic and the weaker Robinson arithmetic, and even to a much weaker theory known as R. A common statement of the lemma (as given below) makes the stronger assumption that the theory can represent all computable functions, but all the theories mentioned have that capacity, as well.

Statement of the lemma 

Intuitively,  is a self-referential formula:  says that  has the property . The sentence  can also be viewed as a fixed point of the operation assigning to each formula  the formula .

Proof
Let  be the function defined by:

for each formula  with only one free variable  in theory , and  otherwise. Here  denotes the Gödel number of formula . Namely

which is to say

Now, given an arbitrary formula  with one free variable , define the formula  as:

Then, for all formulas  with one free variable: 

which is to say

Then the previous line can be rewritten as 

which is the desired result.

(The same argument in different terms is given in [Raatikainen (2015a)].)

History
The lemma is called "diagonal" because it bears some resemblance to Cantor's diagonal argument. The terms "diagonal lemma" or "fixed point" do not appear in Kurt Gödel's 1931 article or in Alfred Tarski's 1936 article.

Rudolf Carnap (1934) was the first to prove the general self-referential lemma, which says that for any formula F in a theory T satisfying certain conditions, there exists a formula ψ such that ψ ↔ F(°#(ψ)) is provable in T. Carnap's work was phrased in alternate language, as the concept of computable functions was not yet developed in 1934. Mendelson (1997, p. 204) believes that Carnap was the first to state that something like the diagonal lemma was implicit in Gödel's reasoning. Gödel was aware of Carnap's work by 1937.

The diagonal lemma is closely related to Kleene's recursion theorem in computability theory, and their respective proofs are similar.

See also
Indirect self-reference
List of fixed point theorems
Primitive recursive arithmetic
Self-reference
Self-referential paradoxes

Notes

References
 George Boolos and Richard Jeffrey, 1989. Computability and Logic, 3rd ed. Cambridge University Press.  
 Rudolf Carnap, 1934. Logische Syntax der Sprache. (English translation: 2003. The Logical Syntax of Language. Open Court Publishing.)
 Haim Gaifman,  2006. 'Naming and Diagonalization: From Cantor to Gödel to Kleene'. Logic Journal of the IGPL, 14: 709–728.
 Hinman, Peter, 2005. Fundamentals of Mathematical Logic. A K Peters. 
 Mendelson, Elliott, 1997. Introduction to Mathematical Logic, 4th ed. Chapman & Hall.
 Panu Raatikainen, 2015a. The Diagonalization Lemma.  In Stanford Encyclopedia of Philosophy, ed. Zalta.  Supplement to Raatikainen (2015b).
 Panu Raatikainen, 2015b. Gödel's Incompleteness Theorems. In Stanford Encyclopedia of Philosophy, ed. Zalta.  
 Raymond Smullyan, 1991. Gödel's Incompleteness Theorems. Oxford Univ. Press.
 Raymond Smullyan, 1994. Diagonalization and Self-Reference. Oxford Univ. Press.
 
 Alfred Tarski, tr. J. H. Woodger, 1983. "The Concept of Truth in Formalized Languages". English translation of Tarski's 1936 article.  In A. Tarski, ed. J. Corcoran, 1983, Logic, Semantics, Metamathematics, Hackett.

Mathematical logic
Lemmas
Articles containing proofs